Minnesota State Highway 115 (MN 115) is a  highway in central Minnesota, which runs from its intersection with U.S. Highway 10 in Randall and continues east to its eastern terminus at its interchange with Highway 371 at Camp Ripley Junction in Ripley Township near the city of Little Falls.

Route description
State Highway 115 serves as an east–west route in central Minnesota between the communities of Randall, Camp Ripley, and Ripley Township.

The route passes by the entrance of, and therefore serves, the Camp Ripley Military Reservation; north of the city of Little Falls.  A portion of Highway 115 serves as the southern border for Camp Ripley.

Highway 115 crosses the Mississippi River near its junction with Highway 371. The bridge also carries a railway line on the same surface as the road deck; this is the only remaining bridge over the Mississippi configured in this way.

The route is legally defined as Route 131 in the Minnesota Statutes. It is not marked with this number.

History
State Highway 115 was authorized on April 22, 1933.

The route was paved by 1942.

The Camp Ripley Bridge carries both the highway and the railroad spur to Camp Ripley over the Mississippi River. It was built in 1930 and rebuilt in 1998.

Before nearby Highway 371 was rebuilt as a four-lane freeway on its new alignment between the city of  Little Falls to just north of Camp Ripley Junction, the eastern terminus of Highway 115 at Highway 371 was previously a 3-way "Y" intermixed with railroad tracks.  With construction on the new Highway 371 being complete in the early 2000s, Highway 115 now ends at an interchange with Highway 371, with the roadway continuing eastbound as Morrison County Road 47 (which was re-aligned to connect to the new interchange).  The old routing of Highway 371 in the immediate area has been turned-back to county maintenance as Morrison County Road 76.  This old portion of Highway 371, including the former "Y"-intersection with Highway 115, has been reconstructed as a frontage road.

Major intersections

References

115
Transportation in Morrison County, Minnesota